María Luz Casal Paz (born 11 November 1958) is a Spanish rock singer. She grew up in the municipality of Boimorto, took singing, piano and ballet classes, and moved to Madrid to pursue a career as a musician.

She became famous in the early 1980s, and remained an important figure in Spanish pop music all through said decade and beyond, with her sound gradually maturing towards soft adult pop. She recorded a cover version of Étienne Daho's French language song "Duel au Soleil" in Spanish called "Un nuevo día brillará", which became a hit song. Since the beginning of her career, she has sold over five million albums.

In 1992, she enjoyed great success with her appearance in the soundtrack of Pedro Almodóvar's acclaimed film High Heels singing Agustín Lara's theme "Piensa en mí".

In January 2007, Luz Casal was diagnosed with breast cancer and underwent an operation at the Ruber Clinic in Madrid, seven months later, she revealed to the Spanish media that she had overcome her disease.  More recently in May 2010, she announced that she had been diagnosed with cancer in her other breast and had to cancel her current tour to be operated on.

Her second name, Luz, means "light" in Spanish.

Biography

Early years 

Luz Casal is the daughter of José Casal and Matilde Paz. When she went to live in Avilés she studied at Paula Frassinetti School, founded by the Dorotean Sisters of Charity. Then, the family went to live in the town of Gijón where she performed for the first time in front of fifty people. There, she studied piano and ballet, apart from that, she formed part of a Rock group called Los Fannys that made versions of other artist's songs. Luz formed part of another band too that performed in Asturias, León and Galicia. Nevertheless, she always wanted to be a solo singer.

In 1977, to start her career on the music scene, and after convincing her parents, she went to Madrid, where she made her first recording called: "La guapa" (The beautiful), and made contact with a lot of record labels until an independent production company gave her an audition as a backing singer, which is how she entered the world of professional music. She was a backing singer for mand artist's recordings, in fact she accompanies Juan Pardo in his live performances. From that moment on, she started composing her first songs, of which she recorded ten, but they were not released. In these years, she made her only appearance in the theatre, taking the role of Raquel Meller in the musical "Las Divinas" (The Divines), performed in the Reina Victoria theatre in Madrid.

In 1980 she released her first single with a multinational company, "El ascensor" (The elevator), a song with a strong Reggae flavour as a tribute to Bob Marley. She presented this song in "Tocata", a very popular music show in RTVE. After that she took part in many festivals held in a lot of countries and took dance classes with Karen Taft, Arnold Taraborelli, Lindsay Kemp, Merche Esmeralda and Goyo Montero.

First recordings 
In 1981, seeking less control over her private life, she joined the company Zafiro and took part in the live album published by the group Leño. The following year she started the recording of her first solo album, en Madrid, Brussels and Amsterdam, which was released in September 1982 and was named: "Luz". The album was produced by Carlos Narea, and included songs composed by herself and by Roque Navaja. She appeared for the first time in a TV program, and participated in a book-album of the poet Xaime Noguerol. In 1983 she recorded the video of the Maxi single "No aguanto más" (I can't stand anymore), then she started making live performances and took part in the tour The rock of a summer night, with Miguel Ríos and Leño, with whom she performed in 35 cities of Spain.

In 1984 she released her second album, "Los ojos del gato" (The eyes of the cat), recorded in Spain, Belgium and (Germany). Some of the songs, written by Ramoncín and Hilario Camacho, started being listened in the whole Europe. Luz kept on studying: piano, chorus and performance. Luz III, released a y year later, in 1985, contains a very popular track called "Rufino", by Carmen Santonja (Member of the band Vainica Doble). That year she performed in a festival held in Czechoslovakia, with artists from other countries; Luz still remembers the impact of listening "No aguanto más" and "Ciudad sin ley" (Lawless city) being played by an orchestra with Wind instruments. In 1986 she gave more than 90 concerts and performed again for Czech Television. In (Germany) she recorded the song "The water is life", for an environmental campaign, with stars such as Mark Knopfler.

In 1987 she recorded an a capella song with the group 'The Christians' for a television program and in May of that year, her next album "Quiéreme aunque te duela" (Love me even if it hurts you), was launched, in which she started to be less of a rocker and discovered herself as a great ballad performer, ballads that would be the greatest hits of that release. The album included her smash hit "A Cada Paso", which became her breakout hit in Latin-America, it climbed to the number one position in Argentina, Chile, Uruguay and Mexico; the Mexican female pop-band Flans made a cover of the song in 1990, and also became a big hit in that country. She participated in the TV program "¡Qué noche la de aquel año!" (¡How incredible was that year's night!), that was hosted by Miguel Ríos, then she travelled to México, Venezuela and New York City.

In 1988 she appeared in the TV program "Viaje con nosotros" (Travel with us), by Javier Gurruchaga (Lead singer of La orquesta Mondragón), and in a benefit gig in Seville, she performed a Tango version of Quiereme aunque te duela.

Massive success 

In 1989 Luz Casal released her new company Hispavox, the album "V" in which Luz counted with the production of Paco Trinidad and Chucho Merchán, a habitual musician of Eurythmics. The album, which sold over 300,000 copies and was her definitive leap to stardom, includes two of the most important songs of her career: "Te Dejé Marchar" (I Let You Go) and "No Me Importa Nada" (Nothing Matters For Me). That year she took part in a festival held in Chile in favour of human rights, among artists and groups such as Sting and U2.

In 1991 Luz, released A Contraluz (Backlight), which sold over 400,000 copies, obtaining four platinum albums. In this album is the bolero "Piensa en mí" (Think Of Me), composed by Agustín Lara, and the song "Un año de amor" were chosen by Pedro Almodóvar for his film Tacones Lejanos (High Heels). Almodóvar translated the latter song, originally by the French Nino Ferrer, from the Italian hit version by Mina. These two massive hits made her a European superstar, especially admired in France.

Following that, Luz took a four-year break away from recording studies, a time when she started thinking about her career because of her success, but she kept on performing in Spain, Latin America, France and other European countries.

In early 1995, Luz travelled to London, with producer Paco Trinidad, to work with Eurythmics engineer Darren Allison and the members of Paul McCartney's band, namely Paul"Wix" Wickens, and Robbie Mackintosh, on tracks for her next album, entitled Como La Flor Prometida (Like The Promised Flower). The album was released later in 1995, four years after her previous album. It sold over 800,000 copies, being the most successful album of her career.

In 1996 she released a compilation album, Pequeños Y Grandes Exitos (Hits, Great And Small). Two years later, she released another compilation album, only in France, "Luz Casal", that sold more than 400,000 copies and included two songs in French, "Tu Ne L'Emporteras Pas" and "Entre Mes Souvenirs". versions of "No Me Importa Nada" and "Entre Mis Recuerdos," respectively. She performed those songs in the Olympia Theatre of Paris and became the first Spanish pop singer playing in La Cigalle Theatre.

Subsequent albums 
In 1999, after four years without having released anything secondary to the death of her father, she recorded "Un Mar De Confianza" (A Sea Of Trust) which sold over 600,000 copies. That year, the song "Mi Confianza" (My Trust) was awarded the Ondas Award in the category for Best Song. She then started a European tour performing in France, Italy, Switzerland and Belgium. Soon after, she collaborated on an album by Rosendo called Siempre Hay Una Historia (There's Always A History), recorded in the Carabanchel Prison. In 2001, she received the Goya Award in the category of Best Original Song from the soundtrack of the animated film El Bosque Animado (The Living Forest).

In November 2002, Luz released the album Con Otra Mirada (With Another Look), with 150,000 copies sold and in October 2004 she released the album Sencilla Alegría (Single Happiness), recorded in Du Manoir Studio with production by Javier Limón. The album, which sold over 150,000 copies and in which Luz offers a voice, includes influences from Flamenco to jazz and also features Chris Barron (from Spin Doctors), Jerry Gonzalez, Olivier Durán, Pablo Guerrero, Rui Veloso, Niño Josele, Quique González and Pablo Novoa amongst some collaborators. This album includes "Negra Sombra" (Black Shadow), a poem by Rosalía de Castro, set to music by Juan Montes Capón, which was on the soundtrack to Mar Adentro, by Alejandro Amenábar.

Having overcome breast cancer, on 12 October 2007 Luz released a new single "Se Feliz" (Be Happy) from her new album, Vida Tóxica (Toxic Life), inspired by her experience with chemotherapy. The album was recorded and mixed in London, once again, with Darren Allison and the same team of musicians who had performed on Como La Flor Prometida, with the addition of bass guitarist Pino Palladino. Vida Tóxica appeared in November 2007.

On 29 September 2009, she published a new album called La Pasión (The Passion), an album in which the singer paid homage to the most important bolero singers from the 1940s to the 1960s. In that album, she made versions of songs such as "Alma Mía" (My Soul), "Cenizas" (Ashes), and "Historia De Un Amor" (The History of a Love). This album went gold in Spain and platinum in France.
Apart from the release of the new album, Luz Casal was awarded with the Medal Of Arts And Culture of France which coincided with the release of her new album.

In 2011 she released "Un ramo de rosas", a compilation album of all the love songs and boleros she recorded during her career. Two years after this release in 2013 the singer launched a new studio album called "Almas gemelas" (Twin souls) in which the song "¿Por qué no vuelves, amor?" (Why don't you return, my love?) was presented as the first and only singles.

After a long hiatus, in 2017 in France, Luz released an album with covers of Dalida, the French diva who inspired many of Casal's songs. One year later, back in Spain, she launched the album "Que corra el aire" (Let the air flow), which was greeted by her fans and also very well received critically.

Discography

Albums / Singles

Compilation albums 
 Pequeños y grandes éxitos (1996)
 The Best of Luz Casal (1998)
 Pequeños, medianos y grandes éxitos (2006) (also separate French edition for France)

Soundtracks 
 Tacones lejanos  (1991)
 El Bosque animado  (2001)

References

External links
 Official Homepage
 
 Boimorto info (in Spanish)
 Review of 'La Pasion' (English)
 Luz Casal at Morkol.com Listen the songs and read the lyrics.

1958 births
Living people
People from Arzúa (comarca)
Singers from Galicia (Spain)
Asturian music
Galician-language singers
French-language singers
Spanish rock singers
Latin Grammy Lifetime Achievement Award winners
Spanish women pop singers
Rock en Español musicians
Women in Latin music